James Patrick "J. P." Hanlon (born 1970) is a United States district judge of the United States District Court for the Southern District of Indiana.

Education 

Hanlon earned his Bachelor of Arts from DePauw University and his Juris Doctor, magna cum laude, from the Valparaiso University School of Law, where he served as an articles editor of the Valparaiso University Law Review.

Legal and academic career 

After graduating from law school, he served as a law clerk to Judge Robert Lowell Miller Jr. of the United States District Court for the Northern District of Indiana. From 1998 to 2001, Hanlon practiced as an associate in the labor and employment practice group at Seyfarth Shaw LLP. From 2001 to 2006, he served for five years as an Assistant United States Attorney for the Southern District of Indiana. During that period, he tried twelve jury and two bench trials to successful resolution on behalf of the government, and argued multiple cases on appeal before the Seventh Circuit.

Before becoming a judge, he was a partner in the Indianapolis office of Faegre Baker Daniels LLP, where he served as co-chair of the firm's white collar defense and investigations practice. Before Faegre Baker Daniels was formed through the merger of Baker & Daniels LLP and Faegre & Benson LLP in 2012, he had been a partner with Baker & Daniels LLP since 2006.

Hanlon has served as an adjunct professor at the Indiana University Robert H. McKinney School of Law, where he taught courses on white collar crime.

Federal judicial service 

On April 10, 2018, President Donald Trump announced his intent to nominate Hanlon to serve as a United States District Judge of the United States District Court for the Southern District of Indiana. On April 12, 2018, his nomination was sent to the Senate. He was nominated to the seat that was vacated by Judge William T. Lawrence, who assumed senior status on July 1, 2018. On June 6, 2018, a hearing on his nomination was held before the Senate Judiciary Committee. On June 28, 2018, his nomination was reported out of committee by a voice vote. On October 11, 2018, his nomination was confirmed by a voice vote. He received his judicial commission on November 5, 2018.

Notable cases

On June 30, 2021, Hanlon issued an injunction against Indiana's "abortion reversal law", blocking the law while it makes its way through the courts.

References

External links 
 

1970 births
Living people
20th-century American lawyers
21st-century American judges
21st-century American lawyers
Assistant United States Attorneys
DePauw University alumni
Federalist Society members
Indiana lawyers
Indiana University faculty
Judges of the United States District Court for the Southern District of Indiana
People from Evanston, Illinois
United States district court judges appointed by Donald Trump
Valparaiso University School of Law alumni